The 1982 South American Jaguars rugby union tour of South Africa was a series of seven matches played by the South American Jaguars rugby union team in South Africa in March and April 1982. The South American team won six of their tour matches, suffering only a single defeat to the South Africa national rugby union team. The South American team's 21-12 victory over South Africa in the second international was a major shock and described by Rothmans Rugby Yearbook as "a phenomenon of international rugby".

The touring team comprised 42 players, including some from the Chile national rugby union team, Uruguay national rugby union team and Paraguay national rugby union team but the players who took part in the two international fixtures were drawn entirely from the Argentina national rugby union team and were described as "effectively the Pumas".

The matches

Touring party

Manager: O. C. Martinez-Bassante
Assistant managers: W. G. Davies, R. F. O'Reilly
Captain: Hugo Porta

References

Sources

South America rugby union tour
South American Jaguars rugby union tour
South American Jaguars rugby union tour
South American Jaguars rugby union tours
Rugby union tours of South Africa
tour
tour
Rugby union and apartheid